Pseudochordodes is a genus of worms belonging to the family Chordodidae.

The species of this genus are found in South America.

Species:

Pseudochordodes bedriagae 
Pseudochordodes bulbareolatus 
Pseudochordodes dugesi 
Pseudochordodes gordioides 
Pseudochordodes guatemalensis 
Pseudochordodes manteri 
Pseudochordodes meridionalis 
Pseudochordodes pardalis 
Pseudochordodes texanus

References

Nematomorpha